The county governor of Finnmark county in Norway represented the central government administration in the county.

In 1576, the king of Norway established Vardøhus len as a new administrative unit for the northern part of the kingdom. In 1661, it became Vardøhus amt that was subordinate to the Trondhjem stiftamt and the king began appointing a county governor. In 1787, the island of Senja and the Troms area were transferred from Nordlandenes amt to Vardøhus amt and the new, larger county was renamed Finmarkens amt. In 1866, the island of Senja and the Troms area were separated from Vardøhus to form the new Tromsø amt. In 1919, the name was again changed to Finnmark fylke. In 2002, the Sami language name, was added as a co-official name for the county. From 1 January 2019 the county governor offices of Troms and Finnmark were merged in anticipation of the merger of the two counties.

From 1844 until 1918, the county was subordinate to the Diocesan Governor of Tromsø who was the civil governor of the Diocese of Tromsø.

The county governor is the government's representative in the county. The governor carries out the resolutions and guidelines of the Storting and government. This is done first by the county governor performing administrative tasks on behalf of the ministries. Secondly, the county governor also monitors the activities of the municipalities and is the appeal body for many types of municipal decisions.

Names
The name of the county (Vardøhus, Finmarken, Finnmark) and the word for county (amt, fylke) have changed over the centuries. From 1661 until 1787 the title was Amtmann i Vardøhus amt. From 1787 until 1918, it was Amtmann i Finmarkens amt. Since 1918, the title was Fylkesmann i Finnmark fylke.

List of county governors
Finnmark county has had the following governors:

References

Finnmark